Egmont Dam is an arch type dam on the Witspruit, near Van Stadensrus, Free State, South Africa. It was established in 1937 and its main purpose is for irrigation use. The hazard potential of the dam is ranked to be high (3).

See also
List of reservoirs and dams in South Africa
List of rivers of South Africa

References 

 List of South African Dams from the Department of Water Affairs and Forestry (South Africa)

Dams in South Africa
Dams completed in 1937